Botelho is a surname, or part of a combined surname.

Notable people with the surname include:
Abel Botelho (1855/6–1917), Portuguese military officer, diplomat and writer
Bruce Botelho (born 1948), American attorney and politician in Alaska
Carlos Botelho (1899–1982), Portuguese painter and cartoonist
Carlos Botelho, Brazilian minister
João Botelho, Portuguese film director
Júlio Botelho (1929–2003), also known as Julinho, Brazilian footballer
Martiniano Ferreira Botelho, Portuguese doctor, politician and philanthropist
Mauricio Botelho, former chairman of Embraer
Poliana Botelho, Brazilian mixed martial artist
Rogério Márcio Botelho, Brazilian footballer

People with the combined surname:
José Maria Botelho de Vasconcelos, Angolan politician and government minister
Pedro Roberto Silva Botelho, Portuguese footballer

Portuguese-language surnames